The Trustfall Tour is the upcoming ninth concert tour by American singer Pink, in support of her ninth studio album Trustfall (2023). It is scheduled to begin on October 12, 2023, in Sacramento, a few days after the end of the North American leg of her Summer Carnival tour.

Background
On February 17, 2023, Pink announced she would be embarking on a 14-city North American arena tour, following the end of her Summer Carnival stadium tour. Additional concerts were subsequently added, due to high demand. On February 27 of the same year, an additional concert in Sunrise, Florida at the FLA Live Arena was added.

Shows

References

2023 concert tours
Concert tours of North America
Pink (singer) concert tours
Upcoming concert tours